Otavalo may refer to:

Otavalo (city), Ecuador
Otavalo Canton, Ecuador
Otavalo people, indigenous people in northern Ecuador
Otavalo Valley in the Ecuadorian Andes near the Cuicocha caldera